Fort Hawkins was a fort built between 1806 and 1810 in the historic Creek Nation by the United States government under President Thomas Jefferson and used until 1824. Built in what is now Georgia at the Fall Line on the east side of the Ocmulgee River, the fort overlooked the sacred ancient earthwork mounds of the Ocmulgee Old Fields, now known as the Ocmulgee Mounds National Historical Park.  The Lower Creek Trading Path passed by just outside the fort's northwestern blockhouse, and continued in a westerly direction until it reached a natural ford on the Ocmulgee River. A trading settlement and later the city of Macon, Georgia, developed in the area prior to the construction of the fort, with British traders being in the area as early as the 1680s. Later, the fort would become important to the Creek Nation, the United States, and the state of Georgia for economic, military, and political reasons.

The fort originally had a tall log palisade surrounding a 1-  complex. It had living and working quarters as well as two blockhouses on diagonal corners. A replica of the southeast blockhouse was constructed in 1938 after archeological excavations in 1936 showed the appropriate site. It has become an icon of Macon.  The Fort Hawkins Archeological Site is listed on the National Register of Historic Places and is included within the boundaries of the Fort Hill Historic District, also listed on the NRHP.

The Fort Hawkins Commission hired the Lamar Institute to conduct archaeological excavations from 2005 to 2007.  The excavations found evidence of a second palisade on the site, as well as several large brick buildings.  In addition, the work recovered nearly 40,000 artifacts, indicating a more complex history of Native American and European-American interaction than had been known.  Historical research by Lamar Institute President Daniel T. Elliott has also added greatly to the current understanding of the fort.  The Commission completed a Master Plan for development of the site in 2008 that is to eventually include the reconstruction of the entire fort complex. It will display and interpret the thousands of artifacts found at the site, which represent the many tribes of American Indians and pioneer European Americans whose lives met in the area through complex trading and living relationships. Although a replica log cabin was completed in 2013 to serve as a Visitors' Center and a few other minor improvements have been made to the site, the fort has not yet been reconstructed as of 2021.

History 
Fort Hawkins was built by the United States in 1806 and through 1824, it was a place of "relatively great economic, military, and political importance." For the Creek Nation, it was a center of the deerskin trade with European Americans, who had a trading post or factory there, but for them it was most important as related to their sacred grounds at Ocmulgee Old Fields. This continued to be a significant social and ceremonial center.

The US government used the fort as a military command headquarters on the southeastern frontier, "a major troop garrison and bivouac point for regular troops and state militia in several important campaigns, and a major government fur trade factory for regulating the Creek economy." President Thomas Jefferson had forced the Creek Nation to cede its lands east of the Ocmulgee River, except for the sacred Ocmulgee Old Fields.  The fort was built at the fall line of the river, about a mile uphill, at the end of navigable water from the Low Country to the Piedmont. It was to be a point for the government's "civilization" of the Creek through introduction of European-American farming and cultural practices. To the north of the fort passed the Lower Creek Pathway, which was improved as part of the Federal Road to connect the nation's capital city with the ports of Mobile, Alabama, and New Orleans, Louisiana. This change encouraged the travel of many more troops, settlers, and visitors to the area and encroached on the Creek Nation territory.

Fort Hawkins (not Fort Benjamin Hawkins) was named for Benjamin Hawkins, who was still serving as the General Superintendent of Indian Affairs (1796–1816) south of the Ohio River, as well as principal US Indian agent to the Creek. A former US Senator from North Carolina, Hawkins had been appointed by President George Washington to deal with the Choctaw, Cherokee and Chickasaw in the larger territory, and helped gain years of peace between the Creek and European-American settlers.  He married Lavinia Downs, the daughter of Isaac Downs, a veteran of the American Revolutionary War.

The fort was used during US military campaigns of the War of 1812 against Great Britain. General Andrew Jackson visited the Fort and used it successfully as a staging area for the Battle of New Orleans of 1814-15, as well as during the Creek and Seminole wars. After the frontier moved farther west, the military threat in inland Georgia essentially ceased.  Through the treaties of 1825 and 1826 signed with the US, the Creek were forced to move west of the Chattahoochee River the following year.  The city of Macon was founded in 1823, and by 1828, the fort was in private ownership.

During its active years, Fort Benjamin Hawkins was used as a Georgia Militia headquarters and muster ground. It was a point of interaction with "the US Army, the Creek Nation, the Georgia militia and the Georgia government." The fort helped reinforce Georgia's western frontier until the state took control by getting the Creek removed to the west, while filling much of the land with European-American settlers.

Ancient cultures of indigenous peoples had long settled near the river.  Evidence of 17,000 years of continuous human habitation has been found at Ocmulgee National Monument. Historically, Native American peoples from the Cherokee, Chickasaw, Choctaw, Creek, and Seminole nations; ethnic European Americans from England, Germany, Ireland, Scotland, and Spain; and West African-descended peoples originally speaking numerous languages from a variety of ethnic cultures, were all represented at the fort. Nearly 40,000 artifacts from trading and residence have been found in 21st-century archaeological excavations at the fort site.

Preservation, reconstruction and excavation 
From 1928, the Daughters of the American Revolution and the Macon Kiwanis Club raised funds to create a replica of one of the blockhouses to memorialize the fort. In 1933 the government began archaeological excavations at the Ocmulgee Old Fields, supported by workers and funding of the US Works Progress Administration (WPA) under President Franklin D. Roosevelt during the Great Depression. In 1936, one of the archaeologists, Gordon R. Willey, did enough work at Fort Hawkins to establish the original "footprint" of the southeast blockhouse.  Construction of a replica blockhouse was completed as a WPA project in 1938. Some of the original stones were recovered to be used in the basement section. The upper floors were made of concrete formed to simulate the original wood timbers, intended to be more durable at a time of uncertain funding for historic work.

Because historical records had been destroyed when Washington, D.C., was burned during the War of 1812, in 1971 the city authorized limited archaeological excavation to establish the original dimensions of the fort. The excavation revealed numerous ceramic artifacts, including remnants of English-American styled dishes used by residents, dated from c.1779 – c.1834.  In 1977 the Fort Hawkins archeological site was listed on the National Register of Historic Places (NRHP).

The City of Macon acquired the historic site in 2002, with help from the state's Greenspace Program and funds from the Fort Hawkins Commission and the Peyton Anderson Foundation. After redevelopment, the city and Commission plan to use the fort site as a greenspace park and as a history center for the city. The southeast blockhouse, which is occasionally opened to the public, has become an icon of the city. Archeologists were concerned that construction of the Fort Hawkins Grammar School and a road on part of the site in the mid-20th century had destroyed the archeological record. Since 2005, archeological excavations at the fort site have shown that extensive artifacts and stratigraphy have survived and can be interpreted.

From 2005 to 2007, in a cooperative project supported by the city, the Fort Hawkins Commission (est. 1990 and led by Marty Willet), the Society for Georgia Archaeology, and the LAMAR Institute, funded archaeologist Daniel T.  Elliott, who led a team in extensive excavations of the fort site. The work revealed evidence of two forts having been constructed there. The final fort had several brick buildings and only one of wood, making it a more substantial complex than originally thought by the limited historical descriptions. In 2007 additional palisades were found, with research indicating that it is likely the outer area was built from 1809–1810 by the US Army's Regiment of Rifles.

By creating a public website for the fort and the archeological work, the Commission and Society for Georgia Archeology have promoted a wider understanding of the research, and the items that have been found. The Commission and the Society have also sponsored public presentations in an effort to educate a wider audiences about the fort, its role as a military and economic center, and as a focal point for the interaction of people and cultures.

The nearly 40,000 artifacts recovered from the fort era (1806–1821), provide insight into the lives of the different groups of people interacting with one another on the American frontier. This evidence demonstrates a more complex and significant history at the fort than previously believed. It has provided evidence that the fort was more important than previously understood, indicating the need for additional study and interpretation of the artifacts. The Fort Hawkins Commission developed a Master Plan in 2008 for the site, which includes a proposal to reconstruct the entire 1.4 acre (5,700 m²) complex.

Excavations in October 2011 concentrated on the outer western and southern walls (circa 1810) of the former stockade. An intrusive 19th century cellar, associated with the Thomas Woolfolk plantation, was also sampled during the 2011 field season.

Limited excavations in May 2012 focused on discovering remnants of the northwestern blockhouse. Indirect evidence of the blockhouse is indicated by the abrupt termination of the western palisade wall (circa 1806) at its northern end. All outward indications of the blockhouse have been lost to erosion and grading.

Fort Hawkins hosts the local chapter of the Society for Georgia Archaeology - the Ocmulgee Archaeological Society - which holds its monthly meetings at the Visitors' Center and hosts an annual Fort Hawkins Archaeology Day each May on the grounds of this important historic archaeological site.   Members of the Society have also served as volunteers during all phases of the Lamar Institute's excavations.

Recognition
1977, Fort Hawkins Archeological Site is listed on the National Register of Historic Places(NRHP).
1993, Fort Hawkins is included in the Fort Hill Historic District, listed on the NRHP.
2002, a State Highway Marker was erected at the fort.
2007, Fort Hawkins was featured in Georgia's Archaeology Month program, capped by a weekend celebration at the fort.

Images

References

External links 

"Historic Fort Hawkins", Fort Hawkins Commission Official Website, includes 2008 Master Plan and photos of three years of excavation at the site (2005–2007)
Daniel T. Elliott, Fort Hawkins: 2005-2007 Field Seasons, The LAMAR Institute, Report 124, 260 pages, full pdf file
"Fort Hawkins Archeological Project", Archaeological Institute of America
Fort Hawkins historical marker
"Ocmulgee Archaeological Society"

1806 establishments in the United States
Infrastructure completed in 1806
19th-century fortifications
Benjamin Hawkins
Buildings and structures in Macon, Georgia
Works Progress Administration in Georgia (U.S. state)
Museums in Macon, Georgia
Protected areas of Bibb County, Georgia
Benjamin Hawkings
Proposed museums in the United States
National Register of Historic Places in Bibb County, Georgia
Benjamin Hawkins